RLF may refer to:

 RLF (gene) (rearranged L-myc fusion), a human zinc finger protein 
 Romanian Land Forces
 Royal Literary Fund
 Revolving Loan Fund
 Retrolental fibroplasia